Gabriele Pontangeli (died 1478) was a Roman Catholic prelate who served as Bishop of Lettere-Gragnano (1455–1478).

Biography
On 30 January 1455, Gabriele Pontangeli was appointed during the papacy of Pope Nicholas V as Bishop of Lettere-Gragnano.
He served as Bishop of Lettere-Gragnano until his death in 1478.

References

External links and additional sources
 (for Chronology of Bishops) 
 (for Chronology of Bishops)  

15th-century Italian Roman Catholic bishops
Bishops appointed by Pope Nicholas V
1478 deaths